Kotagiri taluk is a taluk of Nilgiris district of the Indian state of Tamil Nadu. The headquarters of the taluk is the town of Kotagiri.

Demographics
According to the 2011 census, the taluk of Kotagiri had a population of 108,290 with 52,543  males and 55,747 females. There were 1061 women for every 1000 men. The taluk had a literacy rate of 77.01. Child population in the age group below 6 was 4,277 Males and 4,154 Females.

References 

Taluks of Nilgiris district